Boyd Efram Jones (born May 30, 1961) is a former American football offensive tackle in the National Football League who played for the Green Bay Packers.  Jones played collegiate ball for Texas Southern University and professionally for 1 season, in 1984.

References

1961 births
Living people
Sportspeople from Galveston, Texas
Players of American football from Texas
American football offensive tackles
Texas Southern Tigers football players
Green Bay Packers players